= Silvia Gribaudi =

Italian choreographer and performing artist

- Born: 1974 (age 51–52); Turin, Italy
- Occupations: Choreographer, performer
- Years active: 2004–present
- Known for: Exploring body image, humour and audience interaction in contemporary dance
- Notable work: A Corpo Libero (2009); R.OSA (2017); GRACES (2019); MONJOUR (2021); Grand Jeté (2023)
- Awards: Premio Giovane Danza d’Autore (2009); Premio Hystrio Corpo a Corpo (2021)
- Website: www.silviagribaudi.com

Silvia Gribaudi (born 1974) is an Italian choreographer and performing artist.

Since 2004 she is mostly working on research projects of the social impact of bodies. She is using her choreographic language with the comic elements and concentrated on the relationship between performers and audience.

== Works ==
In her piece "Graces", Gribaudi, inspired by Antonio Canova's "Three Graces", puts herself on the stage as the main protagonist, together with male dancers. The performance itself is a mix of dance, tableaux vivants and comic scenes, engaging with the verbal interaction of performers and audience. The scenography follows the frequent changes in the register of the performance, with performers questioning themselves and the public on questions of gender and role.

== Artistic style and themes ==
Gribaudi's choreographic language is characterised by a focus on the body's “everyday virtuosity” rather than elite or purely formal technique. She often uses humour, irony, the unexpected body, and invites the audience into relational dynamics rather than purely observing. Her work questions stereotypes relating to gender, beauty, age and physicality. For example, GRACES features male dancers exploring a traditionally female sculptural reference, challenging norms of beauty and body type.

== Collaborations and affiliations ==
Gribaudi collaborates extensively across national borders with dance companies, cultural institutes and festivals (e.g., Biennale de Lyon, Torinodanza, TANEC PRAHA) and is involved in European networks like Big Pulse Dance Alliance

== Selected works ==
- A Corpo Libero (2009)
- R.OSA (2017)
- GRACES (2019)
- MONJOUR (2021) – created via site-specific mountain community residency
- GRAND JETÉ (2023)
- SUSPENDED CHORUS (2025)

== Awards ==
- 2009. Giovane Danza D’Autore. For "A Corpo Libero".
- 2017. Finalist UBU Award, Rete Critica Award
- 2019. Premio DANZA&DANZA. Best Italian production for "Graces".
- 2021. Premio Hystrio Corpo a Corpo. Winner.
